Richard Conway is a British-born entrepreneur, author and lecturer based in New Zealand. He is the author of the book How to Get to the Top of Google Search: A Practical SEO Guide, the founder of the company Pure SEO, co-founder of insurance comparison site iCompare and co-founder of the marketing agency Toru Creative.

Career 
Conway founded Pure SEO in New Zealand in October 2009. Pure SEO went on to be named to the Deloitte Fast 50 and Asia Pacific Technology Fast 500 lists and awarded with the Best Emerging Business Award at the 2014 Westpac Auckland Central Business Awards. Conway also oversaw several Pure SEO subsidiary companies, such as Digital Popcorn and Conversion Surgeons.

Around 2014, Conway co-founded insurance comparison site iCompare with former Vero chief executive Roger Bell.

Alongside Tony Falkenstein and Ian Malcolm, Conway developed the PureBiz programme, which provides training for people interested in business and lets them manage their own Pure SEO regional office.

Conway published the guidebook How to Get to the Top of Google Search: A Practical SEO Guide through Random House New Zealand in 2019. He was also named a finalist for the 2019 EY Entrepreneur of the Year Awards.

Conway has served as a speaker at events such as the Marketing Association’s Digital Day Out 2021. He also served as a judge at the 2021 TVNZ NZ Marketing Awards and a guest on the Radio New Zealand program Nine to Noon.

References 

Living people
New Zealand chief executives
Year of birth missing (living people)